The Door with Seven Locks may refer to:

 The Door with Seven Locks (novel), a novel by Edgar Wallace
 The Door with Seven Locks (1940 film), a 1940 British film adaptation
 The Door with Seven Locks (1962 film), a 1962 German film adaptation